Tarata is a town in Cochabamba Department, Bolivia. It is the capital of the Esteban Arze Province.

The towns of Arbieto, Santa Rosa, and Tiataco, surround Tarata.

Tarata is known for its home-made cheese and sausage.

Notable residents 
René Barrientos
Mariano Melgarejo

References

External links 
 Population data and map of Tarata Municipality

Populated places in Cochabamba Department